The Christian Brothers College of Montevideo, commonly referred as Stella Maris College – Christian Brothers or just Christian, is a private, co-educational, not-for-profit Catholic school run by the Christian Brothers of Ireland. The school, is located in the residential neighborhood of Carrasco Norte, Montevideo, Uruguay. The school's head master is Patricia Ponce de Leon. The school is a member of the International Baccalaureate Organization (IBO), currently offering the International Baccalaureate Diploma Program (IBDP). The college also offers valuable international exams such as the IGCSE programs and the A levels. It has a very long list of distinguished former pupils, including economists, engineers, architects, lawyers, politicians and even F1 champions.

The school has also played an important part in the development of rugby union in Uruguay, with the creation of Old Christians Club, the school's alumni club.

Location 

The school is located in the south-east neighborhood of Carrasco Norte in Montevideo's metropolitan area.

History 

It was founded in 1955 by the Christian Brothers, the founders also of Cardinal Newman College, Buenos Aires.

By then many Uruguayans upper class Catholics were unhappy with the educational system of public schools were concerned that their children receive religious education. Between 1953 and 1954 efforts were made to the Christian Brothers for the congregation to be installed in Uruguay, and founded a school for boys in the exclusive suburb of Carrasco.

This created a committee composed of the Moor family, Davie, Surraco Germain, Manuel Pérez del Castillo and Stella Ferreira, Adolfo Gelsi Bidart, Enrique Rozada, Antonio Barreiro, Conrad Hughes, Francisco Ferrer, Rodolfo Anaya, Antonio Galan, Eduardo Strauch and Jorge Alvarez Olloniego. They also collaborated Gallinal Alberto Heber, William Strauch, Roberto Houni, Jorge Eduardo Aznárez and Berenbau.

After arduous negotiations, in early 1955, from Nairobi, Brothers Nairobi J. I. Doorley and J. V. Ryan arrived, with a mission to make final arrangements for the opening of the new school. They rented a house located at 6585 Republic of Mexico Promenade Corner Puyol. Brother Doorley returned to Buenos Aires and was replaced by Brother P. C. Kelly. Shortly after, Brothers J. V. O'Reilly and H. G. McCaig arrived.

Classes began on May 2, 1955. That year a polio epidemic forced authorities to postpone the start of courses. Brother Patrick Kelly, a devotee of the Virgin Mary and, since the school was facing the sea, decided to call it "Stella Maris", as the parish in the area.

The playground for physical activities and sports Carrasco was the beach in front of the house. Later, the Carrasco Polo Club allowed the use of their courts. The school grew rapidly. Of 93 students in 1955 went to 137 in 1956 and 279 in 1958. In 1957 he joined another house on the same block, in Potosi 1536, in the depths of the house of Puyol and the Rambla. In 1959 he began teaching school, with a first year and four teachers.
On March 12, 1961 opened the school's current location on the street Tajes Max, with the blessing of Cardinal Antonio María Barbieri. In late 1962 he graduated the first generation of students in fourth grade.
In 1963 he implemented the system of "Houses" (Casas), which identifies all the students into four groups: Prior, Sion, Iona and Newman, each with a color identificatorio. In 1972 the building was expanded, adding a new section for high school. In 1976 this area was completed with the construction of a second plant to high school, which includes a library and laboratories for physics, chemistry and biology.

In 1985 he joined the first generation of women to high school and, since 1989, joined the first generation of girls to primary school preparatory. Since that year the school became gradually to be mixed at all levels and have three groups by grade rather than the existing two. In 1991 the school added preschool from age four.
The Christian Brothers are not currently residing in Uruguay. In 1998 he left the school, although the institution remains the property of Edmund Rice Education Association, whose local address part three brothers of the congregation.

The Andes Accident of 1972 

The school gained accidental fame when its alumni rugby team flew on Uruguayan Air Force Flight 571, which crashed into the Andes mountains on October 13, 1972. The story of the crash and rescue was first told in the 1974 book Alive: The Story of the Andes Survivors and more recently in the 2006 book Miracle in the Andes: 72 Days on the Mountain and My Long Trek Home. The school also appeared in the documentary, Alive: 20 Years Later.

Twelve of the 45 people on board the plane died in the crash, and more died of their injuries later. Another 8 perished in an avalanche.  The remaining survivors endured hunger, crash-related injuries, altitude sickness, and temperatures that fell to 30 degrees below zero at night.  On their eighth day in the mountains, they heard on the radio that the authorities had stopped searching for them.  When their scarce food reserves were gone, they were forced to eat those who had died in the crash.

On December 12, 3 of the remaining survivors set out to find help, hiking west across the Andes Mountains to reach Chile. After scaling the 15,000-foot Mount Seler, they realized that the trek for help would take them much longer than they had thought.  Therefore, to conserve their limited food supply, one of them returned to the crash site and the other two continued hiking west.

On 21 December 1972, the ninth day of their journey, they were found by huasos who grazed livestock in the high country, and the next day, the world learned of the 16 survivors who had beaten death for 72 days in the Andes mountains, in part by resorting to cannibalism.

Notable alumni 
 Roberto Canessa
 Nando Parrado 
 Carlos Páez Rodríguez
 Gonzalo Rodríguez (racing driver)

References

External links 
 

Stella Maris College (Montevideo)
Uruguayan Air Force Flight 571
Education in Montevideo
Congregation of Christian Brothers secondary schools
Educational institutions established in 1955
1955 establishments in Uruguay
Carrasco, Montevideo
Private schools in Uruguay